David Roe (born 11 September 1965) is a former English professional snooker player, and a four-time ranking tournament quarter-finalist.

Career
Roe was born on 11 September 1965 in Derby. He began his professional career for the 1986–87 snooker season after qualifying through the pro-ticket series. In his second professional season he reached the last 32 or better in four tournaments, and a year later he reached the last 16 of the 1989 World Snooker Championship on his debut in the main event, to reach the top 32 of the rankings. He then had two poorer seasons, before two quarter-finals in 1991/1992. A year later he reached the top 16, despite not reaching a quarter-final in that season.

Roe spent three successive seasons in the Top 16 and reached a highest position of 13th in 1994/1995 (up from, and back down to, no. 16 in 1993/1994 and 1995/1996 respectively). Roe fell out of the top 32 after a succession of early defeats, and never regained this status.

A run to the last 16 of the China Open was the best finish of Roe's 2005–06 season. He had to win three qualifying matches to secure his position at the Beijing event, where he defeated Li Yin Xi (a wild card) and Paul Hunter, before ultimately losing 5–3 to Joe Swail. In 2006/2007 his best were two last-32 runs, and another followed at the 2008 Welsh Open. He won just two matches in the 2008/2009 season, causing him to drop to 62nd in the rankings.

Roe dropped off the tour at the end of the 2009/2010 season, after 24 years as a professional. He moved to Iran, where he coached their national team, and converted to Islam. He later became a snooker coach at the Hong Kong Sports Institute, working with women's world champion Ng On-yee.

Performance and rankings timeline

Career finals

Non-ranking finals: 1 (1 title)

Pro-am finals: 1

Amateur finals: 2 (1 title)

References

1965 births
Living people
English snooker players
Converts to Islam
Sportspeople from Derby